Anjelica L. Gonzalez is a biomedical engineer, scientist, and Associate Professor of Biomedical Engineering at Yale University and is part of the Vascular Biology and Therapeutics Program. Her work focuses primarily on biomimetic materials, or the development of materials that mimic human organs, to study how drugs and other medical interventions can reverse tissue damage caused by environmental pollutants, inflammation, and diseases. She is also the principal investigator for the "PremieBreathe" device which has developed a low-cost device designed to save the lives of premature babies in settings that lack safe respiratory devices.

Early life
Gonzalez's cultural background is Mexican-American and African-American. She grew up Las Vegas, Nevada, and in the Moapa Valley in Nevada. She was raised along with her brother by a single mother who is a blackjack dealer. Her grandfather was director of the Moapa Valley irrigation system and was an early inspiration for her scientific career. She has also discussed being scientifically influenced by her father, a diesel mechanic, who instilled the principles of engineering, and by her mother's mathematical skills.

Education 
Gonzalez attended high school in Las Vegas, and went on to attend  Utah State University in Logan, Utah. In 1999, Anjelica received her Bachelor of Science in Biological Engineering. She initially planned to pursue a career in computational irrigation management, but later began taking biology courses that eventually influenced her change of career course. Also influencing this decision was a Baylor University summer program where she worked with pulmonary specialist Dr. Aladin Boriek. Gonzalez describes this experience as "the first realization that I had that the math, computational skills, the understanding of mechanics and physics, could translate to the physiological system, to human biology." 

Upon graduating, Gonzalez became the first person from her family to receive a bachelor's degree. In 2004, she obtained her Doctor of Philosophy in Computational Biology from Baylor College of Medicine in Houston, Texas. 

During her time at Baylor College of Medicine, Gonzalez was only one of a few minority students in her program, and the only woman actively participating as a graduate student.

Career 

After graduating from Baylor, Gonzalez conducted post-doctoral work in the Leukocyte Biology and Pediatric Intensive Care Unit at Texas Children’s Hospital. She joined the Yale faculty as an associate research scientist in 2007. After two years in this role, she joined the Yale biomedical engineering faculty and in 2014 was appointed the Donna L. Dubinsky Assistant Professor of Biomedical Engineering. As of 2022 she is an appointed Associate Professor in the Department of Biomedical Engineering at Yale University. 

At Yale, Gonzalez developed PremieBreathe, a low-cost mobile neonatal respiratory device meant to treat the breathing problems of prematurely born babies. PremieBreathe was developed and studied in Ethiopia and is supported by the US Agency for International Development (USAID), the Bill and Melinda Gates Foundation, and NCIIA/Venturewell. She is also a founder of Aero Therapeutics, which produces the device.

In 2020, she was also appointed faculty director of the Tsai Center for Innovative Thinking at Yale University (Tsai CITY). In 2022, Gonzalez was appointed head of Davenport College, making her the first Black woman to serve as Head of College in Yale's history.

Her areas of research include:

Leukocyte biology
Vascular biology
Biomaterials
Vascular engineering

Personal life 
Gonzalez has twin sons and resides in New Haven, Connecticut. She plays the violin and enjoys sewing her own clothing.

Awards & honors 
Anjelica has earned numerous awards and distinctions. Here are a selection:
In 2021, Gonzalez was inducted into Yale University's Bouchet Honor Society, named for alumnus Edward Alexander Bouchet
Yale University - Provost's Teaching Award
Yale University's Video Series "Discussions on Science and Diversity" - Host
Yale University's inaugural Faculty of Arts and Sciences Dean’s Award for Inclusion and Belonging 
STEM and Social Inclusion Speaker Series - First Speaker
Newsweek/Womensphere Emerging Leaders Global Summit Speaker
NBC 10 Latino Innovators 
USAID/Gates Foundation DevelopmentxChange Investor Pitch Competition Award Winner
Hartwell Individual Biomedical Research Award for “Artificial Amniotic Membrane Scaffolds for Scarless Wound Healing” (2011)
 Biomedical Engineering Society Diversity Award (2018)

Publications

Books
Engineering Biomaterials for Regenerative Medicine: Novel Technologies for Clinical Applications, Chp. 6, p. 143-160 (co-author) Springer (2011)

Journals
Gonzalez has more than 60 publications. Her most cited work has been cited over 120 times.

Here is a selection of her works that have been cited over 70 times each:

Nanowire substrate-based laser scanning cytometry for quantitation of circulating tumor cells (2012)
SK Lee, GS Kim, Y Wu, DJ Kim, Y Lu, M Kwak, L Han, JH Hyung, JK Seol, ...
Nano Letters

Extracellular mitochondrial DNA is generated by fibroblasts and predicts death in idiopathic pulmonary fibrosis (2017)
C Ryu, H Sun, M Gulati, JD Herazo-Maya, Y Chen, A Osafo-Addo, ...
American Journal of Respiratory and Critical Care Medicine

Daily egg consumption in hyperlipidemic adults-Effects on endothelial function and cardiovascular risk (2010)
V Njike, Z Faridi, S Dutta, AL Gonzalez-Simon, DL Katz
Nutrition Journal

Integrin interactions with immobilized peptides in polyethylene glycol diacrylate hydrogels (2004)
AL Gonzalez, AS Gobin, JL West, LV McIntire, CW Smith
Tissue engineering

Articles 
Gonzalez has contributed opinion articles to multiple publications, including:

 "A Life of Science Was In The Cards," The New York Times
 "Her Scientific Discovery: Support," The New York Times
 "Transitioning from Undergraduate to Graduate School," Science

Quotes
Gonzalez speaks out for women and minorities:

"Data shows that women and minorities are selectively sorted out of engineering, math and science careers."
"Additionally, when they do speak up and exhibit their skills, young women are often overlooked or blatantly dismissed."
"Studies have evaluated whether hard work is rewarded in a fair manner, and determined that cultural norms and implicit biases in many cases prevent equal reward for equal efforts."

References

External links
Oral history interview transcript for Anjelica Gonzalez on 21 October 2020, Niels Bohr Library and Archive, American Institute of Physics
Faculty page for Anjelica Gonzalez
Gonzalez Lab website

Yale University faculty
Baylor College of Medicine alumni
Utah State University alumni
American women engineers
Biomedical engineers
Science communicators
21st-century American women scientists
Living people
Year of birth missing (living people)
American women academics
Hispanic and Latino American scientists
African-American scientists